Villa Solitaria, also known as Casa Solitaria or La Solitaria, is a national historic house built between 1907 and 1910 via del Pizzolungo on the island of Capri (Naples, Italy) by Edwin Cerio (1875–1960), a prominent Italian writer, engineer, architect, historian, and botanist

Surrounded by cliffs and mediterranean plants, isolated yet a few minutes away from Capri's vibrant central piazzetta, it overlooks the most famous rocky stacks in the Mediterranean, the Faraglioni. The particular shape and the legends that hover around the Faraglioni make them magical and evocative places. Homer, in the Odyssey, describes the stacks as the boulders that the Cyclops Polyphemus threw at Ulysses. In the Aeneid, Virgil speaks of it as the meeting place of the siren : from these imposing rocks came their sweet song that enchanted the sailors.

The house's foundations and its theater-shaped garden's walls likely date from the middle-age or possibly earlier. The antique roman imperial port of Tragara, and the Scoglio del Monacone where Masgaba, the architect of Emperor Augustus, was buried, are in the immediate vicinity of the house.

Edwin Cerio built the house without predetermined plans, together with the skills and feelings of local masons, so that each window would become “a painting signed by God”. It filled it with lilies and thistles ceramic floors, and quotes inspired by the biblical Song of Songs’ poetry.

Filippo Tommaso Marinetti, founder of the Futurism movement in 1909, and credited  with spurring the rise of Italian modern architecture and city planning, described La Solitaria as one of the first futurist house of Italy for its verticality, spatial and visual innovations.

Edwin Cerio rented the house from 1914 to 1924 to Sir Edward Compton MacKenzie,  a famous Scottish writer of fiction, biography, history. During this time, La Solitaria became the central meeting point of the English writers living or transiting in Capri, such as Norman Douglas, Francis Brett Young, William Butler Yeats, David Herbert Lawrence, as well as the Scottish music critic and composer, Cecil Gray.  Compton MacKenzie shared with Douglas a passion for botanics, and did plant pines and cypress as well as exotic plants brought back from their numerous overseas trips.

References

Houses completed in the 19th century
Buildings and structures in Capri, Campania
Villas in Campania
Song of Songs
Mediterranea
Futurist architects
Ulysses (novel)
Cyclopes
Capri, Campania
19th-century architecture in Italy